Montpont-en-Bresse (literally Montpont in Bresse) is a commune in the Saône-et-Loire department in the region of Bourgogne-Franche-Comté in eastern France.

Geography
The Sâne Morte forms the commune's south-eastern border. The Sâne Vive flows northwestward through the middle of the commune.

See also
Communes of the Saône-et-Loire department

References

Communes of Saône-et-Loire